The Guadeloupe national rugby union team represents Guadeloupe in the sport of rugby union. Guadeloupe has been playing international rugby since the 1970s.

They have played mainly against Caribbean sides, i.e. Trinidad & Tobago, Bermuda, Guyana, and Barbados.



Record

Overall

See also
 French Rugby Federation
 Comité Territorial de Rugby de Guadeloupe
 Rugby union in Guadeloupe

References

External links
 Comité Territorial de Rugby de Guadeloupe on facebook.com

Rugby union in Guadeloupe
Sports teams in Guadeloupe
Caribbean national rugby union teams
R